The Department of Finance Canada is a central agency of the Government of Canada. The department assists the minister of finance in developing the government's fiscal framework and advises the government on economic and financial issues. A principal role of the department is assisting the government in the development of its annual budget.

The department is responsible to Parliament through the minister of finance (Chrystia Freeland since August 2020, concurrently serving as the deputy prime minister of Canada) and the associate minister of finance (Randy Boissonnault since October 2021, concurrently serving as the minister of tourism). The day-to-day operations of the department are directed by the deputy minister of finance (a public servant), presently Michael Sabia.

The department is headquartered in the James Michael Flaherty Building in downtown Ottawa at the corner of Elgin and Albert.

Branches and sub-agencies
The department is divided into several branches:
 Economic and Fiscal Policy Branch
 Economic Development and Corporate Finance Branch
 Federal-Provincial Relations and Social Policy Branch
 Financial Sector Policy Branch
 International Trade and Finance Branch
 Tax Policy Branch
 Law Branch
 Corporate Services Branch
 Consultations and Communications Branch
Some of the sub-agencies under the Department include:
Bank of Canada
CPP Investment Board
Office of the Superintendent of Financial Institutions
Financial Consumer Agency of Canada
Financial Transactions and Reports Analysis Centre of Canada
Canada Deposit Insurance Corporation
Canada Development Investment Corporation
Royal Canadian Mint

Related legislation

Acts and legislations under the Department:
 Income Tax Act
 Federal-Provincial Fiscal Arrangements Act
 Customs Act
 Customs Tariff Act
 Excise Act
 Excise Tax Act
 Proceeds of Crime (Money Laundering) Act
 Income Tax Conventions Interpretation Act
 Payment Clearing and Settlement Act
 Financial Administration Act
 Special Import Measures Act
 Bretton Woods and Related Agreements Act
 European Bank for Reconstruction and Development Agreement Act

References

External links
 Department of Finance Canada

 
Federal departments and agencies of Canada
Canada
Ministries established in 1867
1867 establishments in Canada